The Peshawar Zalmi is a franchise cricket team that represents Peshawar in the Pakistan Super League. They were one of the six teams that participated in the 2019 season.

The team was captained by Darren Sammy, coached by Mohammad Akram. 
They finished off as Runners-up for the second consecutive season after losing in the final against Quetta Gladiators. They finished first after the completion of their group stage matches, winning seven matches from their ten matches.

Kamran Akmal was team's best batsman with 357 runs from 13 matches. Hasan Ali was team's best bowler with 25 wickets across 13 matches. He was also the leading wicket-taker of the tournament and hence, won the Maroon Cap and Fazal Mehmood award for best bowler of the season.

Squad
Players with international caps are shown in bold
Ages are given as of the first match of the season, 14 February 2019

Season standings

Points table

Season summary
Peshawar Zalmi finished the group stage with first position by winning seven of their matches and losing three. Peshawar came on top because of the higher run rate. Zalmi lost to Quetta Gladiators in the qualifier by 10 runs. Zalmi then defeated Islamabad United by 48 runs in the eliminator to reach the PSL final.

In the final in Karachi, after Peshawar Zalmi's openers got out, Sohaib Maqsood, who scored run-a-ball 20, added 31 runs for the third wicket with Umar Amin (38 runs off 33 balls). Zalmi scored 138-8 in 20 overs batting first. Peshawar Zalmi lost to Gladiators, who achieved the target in 17.5 overs, by 8 wickets finishing runners-up in the league.

References

External links

2019 in Khyber Pakhtunkhwa
2019 Pakistan Super League
Zalmi in 2019
2019